Separatism in the Philippines refers to bids for secession or greater autonomy for certain areas in the Philippines. The scope of the article includes such efforts since the Philippine Revolution both currently and historical.

Secession

Southern Philippines
Several groups had advocated the independence of Mindanao, including the Sulu archipelago and Palawan from the Philippines. Such armed groups include the Moro National Liberation Front, the Moro Islamic Liberation Front, the Bangsamoro Islamic Freedom Fighters, and the Abu Sayyaf.

Separatism during the American colonial period
Historically, several states have governed the region such as the Sulu and Maguindanao sultanates. Other entities such as Sultanate of Buayan and the Pat a Pangampong ko Ranao emerged. These states has resisted attempts by the Spanish Empire to totally subjugate the area. Nevertheless, the Spanish ceded the whole of Philippine archipelago in the Treaty of Paris of 1898. The United States later took control over the area, governing it as part of the Insular Government of the Philippine Islands.

Anticipating that the United States would decolonize the islands and grant the Philippines full independence, Moro leaders has expressed opposition their territories to be included in a future Philippine state. Such instances of this sentiment being expressed include:

 June 9, 1921 – Petition of the people of the Sulu islands to the United States that it prefers to be part of the United States rather than be included in an independent Philippines
 June 9, 1921 Declaration of Rights and Purposes – Issued by Bangsamoro leaders in Zamboanga regarding the status of Mindanao island, Palawan and the Sulu archipelago
Proposal to convert the region to a separate unorganized territory of the United States.
If the Philippines granted independence with the Moro territories included in such state; a plebiscite shall be held to determine the status of Mindanao, Palawan, and Sulu islands 50 years after the independence of the Philippines.
 March 18, 1935 Dansalan Declaration – petition by Maranao leaders not to include Mindanao and Sulu if the Philippines was granted independence.

Kamlon uprising

More seccessionism continued after the United States granted the Philippines full independence in July 4, 1946. Hadji Kamlon launched a rebellion. As a response Sulu's Representative Ombra Amilbangsa filed House Bill No. 5682 in the House of Representatives during the 4th Congress which proposed granting independence for the Sulu islands.

MIM and BMLO
The Muslim Independence Movement arose in 1968 following the Jabidah massacre which advocated secession of the Mindanao, Sulu, and Palawan areas. The organization was later renamed the Mindanao Independence Movement so it could be inclusive to non-Muslims. The Blackshirts was an alleged armed wing of the MIM. By 1969, the group has received financial support from Malaysia but failed to garner wider support from the Moros.

The MIM would be disbanded in 1970 after meeting with then President Ferdinand Marcos. Leaders from the disbanded MIM, both students and older lead figures, would form the Bangsa Moro Liberation Organization (BMLO) but the organization would be disbanded due to internal conflict.

Moro National Liberation Front
The Moro National Liberation Front (MNLF) was established as a result of the Jabidah massacre. While it's unclear when the MNLF was actually established it considers the date of the incident, March 18, 1968 as its foundation date. The MNLF had Nur Misuari as its first chairman and one of its early meetings was in October 1972 in Pangkor Island in Malaysia.

Moro Islamic Liberation Front
The Moro Islamic Liberation Front (MILF) led by Hashim Salamat splintered off from the MNLF when it abandoned its bid for independence in 1978. The MILF formally dropped its bid for independence when it signed the Framework Agreement on the Bangsamoro with the Philippine national government in 2012.

Federal Republic of Mindanao

Reuben Canoy, leader of the Mindanao People's Democratic Movement and former presidential candidate had an averted plan to declare the Federal Republic of Mindanao in 1986. Four years later, the 1990 Mindanao crisis arose where Col. Alexander Noble led a mutiny and proclaimed an independent Federal Republic of Mindanao.Noble along with Canoy, who is also involved as a civilian supporter, was arrested by government authorities but claimed that his effort was successful since it brought into attention issues affecting Mindanao.

Abu Sayyaf
The Abu Sayyaf was formed in 1991 splintering from the Moro National Liberation Front with Abdurajak Abubakar Janjalani as its founder. Its professed goal is to establish an Islamic state comprising Mindanao, the Sulu archipelago, and Palawan as well as areas outside the Philippines specifically Borneo and southern Thailand. The group split into two main factions after Janjalani's death, whose leaders in turn were killed in 2006 and 2007 which led to Abu Sayyaf splitting into several more factions. In 2014, several factions of the Abu Sayyaf swore allegiance to Islamic State of Iraq and Syria (ISIS) which aims to establish a larger Islamic state of its own.

Greater autonomy
These includes efforts to secure greater autonomy for areas or regions in the Philippines while remaining an integral part of the country. Either this efforts involve the creation of an autonomous region within a unitary state or grassroot movements for the creation of a certain subdivision within a federal Philippines.

Other

BansaSug
At the Bangsa Sug Summit in 2018, participants of the convention including claimants of the Sultanate of Sulu, called for the creation of a Bansa Sug federal state consisting of the Sulu archipelago provinces and Zamboanga Peninsula. They also campaigned for the option to "opt-out" from the then-proposed Bangsamoro autonomous region.

Cordillera

Historical bids

Bangsamoro

The Bangsamoro Autonomous Region in Muslim Mindanao (BARMM) is the sole extant autonomous region in the Philippines. It was established after a peace deal between the Philippine government and the Moro Islamic Liberation Front (MILF) which originally pursued for independence. The region was established in 2019 after a two-part plebiscite and succeeded the Autonomous Region in Muslim Mindanao (ARMM).

Previously the Bangsamoro Juridical Entity was attempted to be established as part of the memorandum of agreement on ancestral domain (MO-AD) between the MILF and the Philippine government under the administration of President Gloria Macapagal Arroyo in 2008. However the MO-AD was declared unconstitutional by the Supreme Court.

Federal State of the Visayas

The Federal State of the Visayas was an independent revolutionary state during the Philippine Revolution. Its proponents intended it to be a subunit of the Philippines under a federal form of government.

See also 
 Autonomous Region in Muslim Mindanao
 Proposed federal states of the Philippines
 Elections in the Philippines
 Referendums in the Philippines

References

 
Politics of the Philippines by issue